Adom Praiz is an annual gospel music concert taking place at The Perez Dome in Accra, Ghana. It was started in 2009 at the Accra International Conference Centre and organized by Adom FM. The event have been attended by both local and international award-winning gospel musicians and groups.

Artists 
Some notable musicians to have performed the event included:

Local 
 Denzel Prempeh
 Stella Aba Seal
 Kwaku Gyasi

International 

 Kirk Franklin
 Ron Kenoly
 Cece Winans
 Israel Houghton 
 Brooklyn Tabernacle Choir
 Hezekiah Walker

References 

Annual events in Ghana
2009 in Ghana